Vlkoš is a municipality and village in Hodonín District in the South Moravian Region of the Czech Republic. It has about 1,000 inhabitants.

Notable people
Sergěj Ingr (1894–1956), army general and Minister of National Defense

References

Villages in Hodonín District
Moravian Slovakia